Wallingford by-election may refer to:

 1872 Wallingford by-election
 1880 Wallingford by-election